This bibliography of Franklin D. Roosevelt is a selective list of scholarly works about Franklin D. Roosevelt,  the thirty-second president of the United States (1933–1945).

General
 Graham, Otis L. and Meghan Robinson Wander, eds. Franklin D. Roosevelt: His Life and Times. (1985). An encyclopedic reference. online
 ; 35 essays by scholars.

Biographical
 .
 : despite the title, a highly favorable biography by scholar. Plus Author Webcast Interview at the Pritzker Military Library on January 22, 2009
 
 .
 
 
 .
 
 .
 : the most detailed scholarly biography; ends in 1934.
 Frank Freidel, Franlkin D. Roosevelt The Apprenticeship (vol 1 1952) to 1918; online
 Frank Freidel, Franklin D. Roosevelt The Ordeal (1954), covers 1919 to 1928  online
 Frank Freidel, Franklin D. Roosevelt The Triumph (1956) covers 1929-32 online
 ; covers entire life.
 ; popular joint biography
 
 .
 .
 
 .
 
 
 
 
 : covers 1905–32.

Scholarly topical studies

 .
  200 pp; overview by leading British scholar.
 .
 
 ; On his environmental and conservation beliefs & policies.
 
 Dunn, Susan. Roosevelt's Purge: How FDR Fought to Change the Democratic Party (2010), on 1938.

 
 .
 
 Hiltzik, Michael. The New Deal: A Modern History (2011), popular history emphasizing personalities; online

 Jeffries, John W. "A 'Third New Deal'? Liberal Policy and the American State, 1937-1945." Journal of Policy History 8.4 (1996): 387-409.
 .
  
 .
 .
 
 .

 
 .
 
 , on 1940 election.
 , 768 pages; essays by scholars covering major historiographical themes. 
  . Study of Roosevelt's 1932 election.
  . Study of Roosevelt's 1936 re-election landslide.
 Price, Charles M. and Joseph Boskin. "The Roosevelt 'Purge': A Reappraisal" Journal of Politics (1966) 28#3 660–670. doi:10.2307/2128161 
 , balanced summary
 .
 .
 Savage, Sean J. Roosevelt, the Party Leader, 1932-1945 (1991). 
 , the classic narrative history. Strongly supports FDR.
 .
 .
 
 Yoo, John. "Franklin Roosevelt and Presidential Power." Chapman Law Review 21 (2018): 205+. [ on line], a view from the right

Foreign policy and World War II
 Beitzell, Robert. The uneasy alliance; America, Britain, and Russia, 1941-1943 (1972) online
 
 
 
 
 .
 
 Feis, Herbert. Churchill, Roosevelt, Stalin; the war they waged and the peace they sought (1957) online
 , 253 pp.
  514 pp.
 .
 
 Kaiser, David. No End Save Victory: How FDR Led the Nation into War (2014) excerpt and text search
 .
 Lacey, James. The Washington War: FDR's Inner Circle and the Politics of Power That Won World War II (2019)
 . The Undeclared War, 1940–1941 (1953) . highly detailed and influential two-volume semi-official history
 . Detailed history of how FDR handled the war.
 McNeill, William H. America, Britain, and Russia: Their Co-operation and Conflict, 1941-1946 (1953)
 Mayers, David. FDR's Ambassadors and the Diplomacy of Crisis: From the Rise of Hitler to the End of World War II (2013)
 
 
 , Pulitzer Prize.
 
 
 . Overall history of the war; strong on diplomacy of FDR and other main leaders.
 .

Criticism

 . A revisionist blames FDR for inciting Japan to attack.
 ; summarizes newspaper editorials.
  criticizes intellectuals who supported FDR.
 , 433 pp.
 , critique from the left.
 . 248 pp.
 .
 , former FDR supporter condemns all aspects of FDR.
 .
 , says US should have let USSR and Germany destroy each other.
 .
 .
  says FDR's racism was primarily to blame.
 , compares populist and paternalist features.
 
  by libertarian economist who blames both Hoover and FDR.
 . Attacks Roosevelt for passive complicity in allowing Holocaust to happen.

FDR's rhetoric

 .
 .
 .
 .
 .
 .
 .
 
 .
 .
 .

Historiography

 Hendrickson, Jr., Kenneth E. "FDR Biographies," in William D. Pederson, ed. A Companion to Franklin D. Roosevelt (2011) pp 1–14 
 Provizer, Norman W. "Eleanor Roosevelt Biographies," in William D. Pederson, ed. A Companion to Franklin D. Roosevelt (2011) pp 15–33

See also
 Bibliography of World War II
 Bibliography of Eleanor Roosevelt

External links

 Franklin D. Roosevelt Presidential Library and Museum
 Franklin Delano Roosevelt: A Resource Guide from the Library of Congress
 
 
 Franklin D. Roosevelt Personal Manuscripts

Roosevelt, Franklin D.
Franklin D. Roosevelt-related lists
Roosevelt, Franklin D.
Roosevelt, Franklin